Lead(II) phosphate is an ionic compound with chemical formula Pb3(PO4)2.  Lead(II) phosphate is a long-lived electronically neutral reagent chemical. Despite limited tests on humans, it has been identified as a carcinogen based on tests on animals conducted by the EPA.  Lead(II) phosphate appears as hexagonal, colorless crystals or as a white powder. Lead(II) phosphate is insoluble in water and alcohol but soluble in Nitric acid (HNO3) and has fixed alkali hydroxides. When lead(II) phosphate is heated for decomposition it emits very toxic fumes containing Lead (Pb) and POx.

It is prepared by reacting lead(II) acetate with sodium orthophosphate.

3Pb(OH)2+2H3PO4=Pb3(PO4)2+6H2O

References

Lead(II) compounds
Phosphates